Margaret Harrison (5 May 1918 – 15 April 2015) was a Scottish peace campaigner active in the anti-nuclear weapons movement who was arrested at least 14 times. She was married to Bobby Harrison.

References

External links
http://www.banthebomb.org/magazine/Feb07/bobbyharrison.html

1918 births
2015 deaths
British anti–nuclear weapons activists
People from Dumbarton
Scottish Episcopalians
Scottish anti-war activists